The bronze tube-nosed bat (Murina aenea) is a species of vesper bat in the family Vespertilionidae.
It is found only in Malaysia.

References

Murininae
Taxonomy articles created by Polbot
Mammals described in 1964